Col du Glandon is a high mountain pass in the Dauphiné Alps in Savoie, France, linking Le Bourg-d'Oisans to La Chambre. It is situated between the Belledonne, Grandes Rousses and Arvan-Villards mountain ranges, west of the Col de la Croix de Fer. The road over the Col du Glandon was opened in 1898, although it was not linked to the Col de la Croix de Fer until 1912.

The pass is normally closed from the beginning of November to mid May. It is sometimes used by the Tour de France cycle race, including on the 2013 Tour.

Details of the climb
From La Chambre (north-east) the climb follows the D927. The gradient increases as the road approaches the summit, with the last two kilometres exceeding 10% with stretches at 12%.

From Le Bourg-d'Oisans the route follows the D1091 through the Romanche valley before joining the D526 after . The climb starts at the Barrage du Verney from where there is a further  to the summit, which is reached shortly after the junction with the route to Col de la Croix de Fer.

In the climb from La Chambre mountain pass cycling milestones are placed every kilometre.  They indicate the distance to the summit, the current height, and the average slope in the following kilometre. Such signposting for cyclists has become common in most major mountain passes in the French Pyrenees and Alps.

Tour de France
The Col du Glandon was first crossed in the Tour de France in 1947 in conjunction with the Col de la Croix de Fer when the first rider over the summit was Edward Klabiński. The pass is often used in conjunction with the Col de la Croix de Fer when it is not categorized for the King of the Mountains competition.

Categorized appearances in Tour de France

See also
 List of highest paved roads in Europe
 List of mountain passes

References

External links
 
Map, Elevation profile, photos for cycling Col du Glandon (www.cycling-challenge.com) 
Cycling the Col du Glandon from both sides - tips and advice (www.cyclingascents.com)
Photos of the climb to Col du Glandon (www.grenoblecycling.com)
Col du Glandon on Google Maps (Tour de France classic climbs)

Mountain passes of the Alps
Mountain passes of Auvergne-Rhône-Alpes
Landforms of Savoie
Transport in Auvergne-Rhône-Alpes